This is a list of Croatian television related events from 1978.

Events

Debuts

Television shows

Ending this year

Births
9 April - Vesna Pisarović, singer & TV host
18 April - Vanja Rupena, model & TV host
16 July - Ana Vilenica, actress

Deaths